The 1987 UCI Road World Championships took place in Villach, Austria. Stephen Roche completed the rare Triple Crown of Cycling, winning the Giro d'Italia and the Tour de France before winning the Men's Road Race, and was only the second cyclist to achieve it following Eddy Merckx in 1974.

Events summary

References

 
UCI Road World Championships by year
W
R
R
UCI Road World Championships